Palesha Goverdhan (पलेशा गोवर्धन) (born 25 July 2003 in Kathmandu) is a Nepalese parataekwondo practitioner. She competed at the 2020 Summer Paralympics in the 58 kg category.

Goverdhan lost 21–8 in a tough first round match to Beth Munro from the United Kingdom. Munro would go on to win the silver medal.  Goverdhan won repechage match against Brianna Salinaro of USA by 10-0  points; against Marija Mičev  of Serbia by 23-15 points and finally lost to China's Li Yujie by 9-12 points in the Tokyo 2020 Summer Paralympics Games but she became the first Nepalese athlete to make history by winning two fights in the Paralympic Games.

She has been training with coach Kabiraj Negi Lama in Nepal Taekwondo Association since 2016. 

She won the first historical gold medal for Nepal by defeating Ebrahimi Roza 6-0 points from Iran in the final of the 2021 Asian Youth Para Games. 

Gobardhan won the bronze medal in the 4th Asian Para Taekwondo Championship in Vietnam held on 18 July 2018 at Hochiminh, Vietnam.

References

2003 births
Living people
Nepalese female taekwondo practitioners
Taekwondo practitioners at the 2020 Summer Paralympics
21st-century Nepalese women